Ruggero Settimo (19 May 1778 – 2 May 1863) was an Italian politician, diplomat, and patriotic activist from Sicily. He was a counter-admiral of the Sicilian Fleet. He fought alongside the British fleet in the Mediterranean Sea against the French under Napoleon Bonaparte. He reconquered the island of Malta, and defended the city of Gaeta near Naples. 

In 1811 he had to retire from the military due to health problems. He was a member of the Sicilian government of Prince Castelnovo in 1812 as Minister of the merchant navy. He was a member of the revolutionary junta of 1820–1821. In 1848 as president of the Sicilian Senate, he was appointed as chief of the government of the Kingdom of Sicily; he led the Sicilian government until 1849. After unification in 1861, Settimo was elected as President of the Senate of the newly created Parliament of the Kingdom of Italy.

Life

Ruggiero Settimo was born in Palermo, Sicily. He was one of the most important leaders of the Sicilian revolution of independence of 1848, after which he was effective head of state of an independent Sicily for 16 months that replaced the Bourbon Two Sicilies.  Once the rebellion was put down by King Ferdinand II's army, Settimo escaped to Malta, where he lived the next twelve years in exile.

Following the success of the Risorgimento movement during 1860 and 1861, Settimo was elected as President of the Senate of the newly created Parliament of the Kingdom of Italy, serving until his death.

A statue in his honor was erected in front of the Teatro Politeama Garibaldi of Palermo.

See also
 Revolutions of 1848
 Revolutions of 1848 in the Italian states

References

Bibliography

 Correnti, Santi (2002) A Short History of Sicily, Les Editions Musae, Montreal.
 Scianò, Giuseppe (2004) Sicilia, Sicilia, Sicilia!, Edizione Anteprima, Palermo (in Italian).

1778 births
1863 deaths
Politicians from Palermo
People of the Revolutions of 1848
Members of the Senate of the Kingdom of Italy
Italian commanders of the Napoleonic Wars
Burials at San Domenico, Palermo
Members of the Sicilian Parliament
Prime ministers
18th-century Italian politicians
19th-century Italian politicians